Janette Carter (July 2, 1923 – January 22, 2006), daughter of musicians A.P. and Sara Carter, was an American musician involved in the preservation of Appalachian music.

Carter was born on July 2, 1923, in Maces Spring, Virginia. She and her brother Joe performed with their parents on a series of recordings for the Acme label. Janette and Joe later recorded material together consisting of works they had written and songs previously recorded by members of the Carter family.

In 1976, Carter and community members built an 880-seat amphitheater, the Carter Family Fold, beside the A. P. Carter Store which her father had operated after the Carter Family had disbanded as a musical group. The Carter Family Fold attracts more than 50,000 visitors a year. Carter performed there weekly, until shortly before she died.

Carter had three children with her first husband, James Jett: Donald William, Rita Janette, and James Delaney (Dale). She died on January 22, 2006, in Kingsport, Tennessee, after battling Parkinson's disease and other illnesses. She was buried next to her mother, Sara Carter Bayes, and her brother, Joe, at the Mount Vernon United Methodist Church Cemetery in Maces Spring.

Carter is a recipient of a 2005 National Heritage Fellowship awarded by the National Endowment for the Arts, which is the United States' highest honor in the folk and traditional arts, in recognition for her lifelong advocacy for the performance and preservation of Appalachian music.

References

External links
Official Carter Family Fold Website

Bluegrass musicians from Virginia
American women country singers
American country singer-songwriters
1923 births
2006 deaths
National Heritage Fellowship winners
People from Scott County, Virginia
20th-century American singers
Singer-songwriters from Virginia
Cash–Carter family
The Carter Family members
20th-century American women singers
21st-century American women
Deaths from Parkinson's disease